The Hôtel de Marigny is a town house in Paris, France, on the Avenue Marigny, not far from the Elysée Palace. It is used as a state guest house for state visitors to France. The house has been the property of the French government since 1972.

In 1872, the Baron decided to combine the two buildings into a single property and to erect additional buildings on part of the site. On May 17, 1879, he acquired the town house at 13 Avenue Marigny. Extensive work was carried out on the site from 1873 onwards, lasting for nearly 10 years, under the direction of the Baron's architect, Alfred-Philibert Aldrophe. 

Today, the Hôtel Marigny comprises a main building with one two-story wing at right angles, standing above a vast basement area for the domestic services. The main emphasis is on the monumental central part of the façade: the entrance to the main lobby comprises two lower-level reception areas beneath the raised ground-floor, while the upper portion contains four Corinthian columns framing a bay window and two niches, bearing a frame and sculpted frontispiece of the same provenance.

References 
 Palais de l'Elysée  - Website of the Office of the French President

External links

Official residences in France
Buildings and structures in Paris
Buildings and structures in the 8th arrondissement of Paris
Champs-Élysées
Rothschild family residences
State guesthouses